Mandall Lake is a lake in Chisago County, Minnesota, in the United States.

Mandall Lake was named for Lars Mandall, a pioneer settler.

See also
List of lakes in Minnesota

References

Lakes of Minnesota
Lakes of Chisago County, Minnesota